Cross-country skiing at the 1992 Winter Paralympics consisted of 27 events, 19 for men and 8 for women.

Medal table

Medal summary 
The competition events were:
2.5 km: - women
5 km: men - women
10 km: men - women
20 km: men
30 km: men
3x2.5 km relay: men
3x5 km relay: men
4x5 km relay: men

Each event had separate standing, sitting, or visually impaired classifications:

LW2 - standing: single leg amputation above the knee
LW3 - standing: double leg amputation below the knee, mild cerebral palsy, or equivalent impairment
LW4 - standing: single leg amputation below the knee
LW5/7 - standing: double arm amputation
LW6/8 - standing: single arm amputation
LW9 - standing: amputation or equivalent impairment of one arm and one leg
LW 10 - sitting: paraplegia with no or some upper abdominal function and no functional sitting balance
LW 11 - sitting: paraplegia with fair functional sitting balance
B1 - visually impaired: no functional vision
B2 - visually impaired: up to ca 3-5% functional vision
B3 - visually impaired: under 10% functional vision

Men's events

Women's events

See also
Cross-country skiing at the 1992 Winter Olympics

References 

 

 Winter Sport Classification, Canadian Paralympic Committee

1992 Winter Paralympics events
1992
Paralympics